This article contains information about the literary events and publications of 1902.

Events
January 5
The political drama Danton's Death (Dantons Tod, completed and published in 1835) by Georg Büchner (died 1837), is first performed, at the Belle-Alliance-Theater in Berlin by the Vereins Neue Freie Volksbühne.
George Bernard Shaw's controversial 1893 play Mrs. Warren's Profession receives its first performance at a private London club.
January 23 – The first example of a Sherlockian game – a study of inconsistencies of dates in Arthur Conan Doyle's The Hound of the Baskervilles (the serialisation of which in The Strand Magazine concludes in April) by publisher Frank Sidgwick – appears in The Cambridge Review.

April – Mark Twain buys a home in Tarrytown, New York. On June 4 he receives an honorary doctorate of literature from the University of Missouri.
June 16 – Bertrand Russell writes to Gottlob Frege about the mathematical problem to become known as Russell's paradox.
July 1 – The Romanian language literary review Luceafărul begins publication in Budapest.
August 6 – În sat sau la oraș (In the Village or in the City), by the Romanian peasant leader Constantin Dobrescu-Argeș, is performed in his native Mușătești, in front of an audience comprising Education Minister Spiru Haret and some 2,000 villagers.
September 9 – P. G. Wodehouse leaves his job at the Hongkong and Shanghai Banking Company in London to become a freelance writer. On September 18, his first published novel, the St. Austin's school story The Pothunters, is published in London by A & C Black, as a truncation of the version in their Public School Magazine from January to March.
Early October – Beatrix Potter's self-illustrated children's book The Tale of Peter Rabbit (originally published privately a year earlier) appears in its first trade edition with Frederick Warne & Co in London. It sells 28,000 copies by the end of the year.
October 5 – Thousands attend the funeral of the French novelist Émile Zola at the Cimetière de Montmartre, Paris. They include Alfred Dreyfus, given special permission by Mme Zola to attend.
November 4 – J. M. Barrie's comedy The Admirable Crichton is first performed, at the Duke of York's Theatre in London, starring H. B. Irving, Henry Kemble and Irene Vanbrugh. It runs for 828 performances.
December 5 – Leo Tolstoy's drama The Power of Darkness («Власть тьмы», Vlast' t'my, written in 1886) has its Russian-language première at the Moscow Art Theatre by Konstantin Stanislavski with some success, although Stanislavski is self-critical.
December 18 – Maxim Gorky's drama The Lower Depths – Scenes from Russian Life («На дне», Na dne) is first performed, at the Moscow Art Theatre, as a first major success for Konstantin Stanislavsky as director and star.
unknown date – The poet Ștefan Petică's cycle Fecioara în alb is published, marking a maturing of Romanian Symbolism.

New books

Fiction
Azorín – La voluntad (Volition)
Jane Barlow – The Founding of Fortunes
Pío Baroja – Camino de perfección (pasión mística) (Road to Perfection)
Edward Harold Begbie (as Caroline Lewis) – Clara in Blunderland
Arnold Bennett
Anna of the Five Towns
The Grand Babylon Hotel
Rhoda Broughton – Lavinia
Joseph Conrad
Typhoon (serialized in The Pall Mall Magazine January–March and US book publication)
Youth: a Narrative, and Two Other Stories, incorporating Youth: a Narrative (1898) and Heart of Darkness (first 1899)
The End of the Tether
Marie Corelli – Temporal Power: A Study in Supremacy
Miguel de Unamuno – Amor y pedagogía
Ramón del Valle-Inclán – Sonatas: Memorias del Marqués de Bradomín – Sonata de otoño (Sonatas: The Pleasant Memories of the Marquis of Bradomín – Autumn Sonata)
Arthur Conan Doyle – The Hound of the Baskervilles
Paul Laurence Dunbar – The Sport of the Gods
Hamlin Garland – The Captain of the Gray-Horse Troop
André Gide – L'immoraliste
Ellen Glasgow – The Battle-Ground
Annie French Hector – Kitty Costello
Theodor Herzl – The Old New Land
Violet Jacob – The Sheepstealers
W. W. Jacobs – The Lady of the Barge (short stories, including "The Monkey's Paw")
Henry James – The Wings of the Dove
Alfred Jarry – Supermale (Le Surmâle: roman moderne)
Mary Johnston – Audrey
Olha Kobylianska – Zemlya (Land)
Liang Qichao – Xin Zhongguo weilai ji (新中國未來記, The Future of New China; unfinished)
Jack London – A Daughter of the Snows
George Barr McCutcheon – Brewster's Millions
Charles Major – Dorothy Vernon of Haddon Hall
A. E. W. Mason – The Four Feathers
W. Somerset Maugham – Mrs Craddock
Dmitri Merejkowski – The Romance of Leonardo da Vinci
Arthur Morrison – The Hole in the Wall
Frank Norris – The Pit (serialization)
Luigi Pirandello – Il Turno
W. Heath Robinson – The Adventures of Uncle Lubin
Saki – The Westminster Alice
Percy Sykes – Ten Thousand Miles in Persia
Jules Verne – The Kip Brothers (Les Frères Kip)
Eduard Vilde – Mahtra sõda (The war in Mahtra)
Edith Wharton – The Valley of Decision
Owen Wister – The Virginian

Children and young people
L. Frank Baum – The Life and Adventures of Santa Claus
J. M. Barrie – The Little White Bird (includes the story "Peter Pan in Kensington Gardens")
Edith Ogden Harrison – Prince Silverwings and other fairy tales
William Dean Howells – The Flight of Pony Baker
Rudyard Kipling – Just So Stories for Little Children
Bessie Marchant – Fleckie: A Story of the Desert, etc.
E. Nesbit – Five Children and It
Beatrix Potter – The Tale of Peter Rabbit
Edward Stratemeyer – The Young Volcano Explorers
Mrs George de Horne Vaizey – A Houseful of Girls
C. N. and A. M. Williamson – The Lightning Conductor: the Strange Adventures of a Motor-car
P. G. Wodehouse – The Pothunters

Drama
J. M. Barrie – The Admirable Crichton
Gaston Arman de Caillavet and Robert de Flers – Le Cœur a ses raisons
Constantin Dobrescu-Argeș – În sat sau la oraș (In the Village or in the City, first performance)
Clyde Fitch – The Girl with the Green Eyes
Cosmo Gordon-Lennox – The Marriage of Kitty
Maxim Gorky – The Lower Depths
Haralamb Lecca – Septima. Câiniĭ
Maurice Maeterlinck – Monna Vanna
Frank Wedekind – King Nicolo
W. B. Yeats – Cathleen Ní Houlihan

Poetry

Edwin James Brady – The Earthen Floor
Walter de la Mare (as Walter Ramal) – Songs of Childhood
Ștefan Petică – Fecioara în alb

Non-fiction
Jane Addams – Democracy and Social Ethics
James Allen – As a Man Thinketh
Hilaire Belloc – The Path to Rome
Euclides da Cunha – Os Sertões (translated as Rebellion in the Backlands)
Arthur Conan Doyle – The War in South Africa: Its Cause and Conduct
Michael Fairless (pseudonym of Margaret Barber) – The Roadmender
John A. Hobson – Imperialism: a study
William James – The Varieties of Religious Experience
Vilfredo Pareto – Les Systèmes socialistes
Bertrand Russell – A Free Man's Worship
William Wynn Westcott – Collectanea Hermetica (finishes publication)

Births
January 1 - Muhammad Zaki Abd al-Qadir, Egyptian journalist and writer (d. 1981) 
January 5 – Stella Gibbons, English novelist (died 1989)
January 20 – Nazim Hikmet, Turkish lyricist and dramatist (died 1963)
January 30 – Nikolaus Pevsner, German-born architectural historian (died 1983)
February 1 – Langston Hughes, African-American poet and novelist (died 1967)
February 16 – Ion Călugăru, Romanian novelist, short story writer and journalist (died 1956)
February 19 – Kay Boyle, American writer, educator and political activist (died 1992)
February 27 – John Steinbeck, American novelist and journalist (died 1968)
March 10 – Stefan Inglot, Polish historian (died 1994)
March 29 – Marcel Aymé, French novelist and short-story writer (died 1967)
April 2 – Jan Tschichold, German-born typographer (died 1974)
April 6 – Julien Torma, French poet and dramatist (died 1933)
April 9 – Lord David Cecil, English literary critic and biographer (died 1986)
April 23 – Halldór Laxness, Icelandic novelist (died 1998)
June 5 – Hugo Huppert, Austrian poet, writer and translator (died 1982)
July 10 – Nicolás Guillén, Afro-Cuban poet (died 1989)
July 8 – Gwendolyn B. Bennett, African American writer and artist (died 1981)
July 27 - Yaroslav Halan, Ukrainian playwright, translator, and publicist (died 1949)
August 15 – Katharine Brush, American short story writer (died 1952)
August 16 – Georgette Heyer, English novelist (died 1974)
August 19 – Ogden Nash, American poet and humorist (died 1971)
August 24
Felipe Alfau, Spanish-American fiction writer, poet and translator (died 1999)
Fernand Braudel, French historian (died 1985)
September 21 – Luis Cernuda, Spanish poet (died 1963)
September 25 – Ernst von Salomon, German writer (died 1972)
October 13 – Arna Bontemps, African American poet (died 1973)
October 23 – Dadie Rylands (George Rylands), English Shakespeare scholar (died 1999)
October 26 – Beryl Markham (Beryl Clutterbuck), English-born Kenyan adventurer and memoirist (died 1986)
October 31 – Carlos Drummond de Andrade, Brazilian poet (died 1987)
November 1 – Nordahl Grieg, Norwegian poet and author (killed in action 1943)
November 2 
Hu Feng (胡风), Chinese novelist (died 1985)
Gyula Illyés, Hungarian author (died 1983)
November 29 – Carlo Levi, Italian writer (died 1975)
December 7 – N. Crevedia, Romanian poet, novelist and journalist (died 1978).
December 20 – Jolán Földes, Hungarian novelist and playwright (died 1963)

Deaths

January 7 – Wilhelm Hertz, German poet and translator (born 1835)
April 6 – Gleb Uspensky, Russian writer (born 1843)
April 20 – Frank R. Stockton, American writer and humorist (born 1834)
April 21 – Ethna Carbery, Irish poet (born 1866)
April 27 – Nancy H. Adsit, American art lecturer, art educator, and writer of art literature (born 1825)
May 5 – Bret Harte, American author and poet (born 1836)
May 6 
 Martha Perry Lowe, American social activist and organizer (born 1829)
 Emma Augusta Sharkey, American dime novelist (born 1858)
May 17/18 — Harriet Abbott Lincoln Coolidge, American philanthropist, author and reformer (b. 1849)
June 10 – Jacint Verdaguer, Catalan poet (born 1845)
June 18 – Samuel Butler, English novelist (born 1835)
July 10 – Annie French Hector (pseudonym Mrs Alexander), Irish-born novelist (born 1825)
August 31
 August 31
Grace Hinsdale, American religious writer (born 1832)
Mathilde Wesendonck, German poet (born 1828)
September 11 – Ernst Dümmler, German historian (born 1830)
September 19 – Masaoka Shiki (正岡 子規), Japanese haiku poet (born 1867)
September 29
William McGonagall, Scottish doggerel poet (born 1825)
Émile Zola, French novelist (carbon monoxide poisoning, born 1840)
October 7 – George Rawlinson, English historian (born 1812)
October 13 – John George Bourinot, Canadian historian (born 1836)
October 25 – Frank Norris, American novelist (peritonitis, born 1870)
October 31 – Cornélie Huygens, Dutch writer, social democrat and feminist (born 1848)
November 16 – G. A. Henty, English historical novelist (born 1832)
December 26 – Mary Hartwell Catherwood, American author and poet (born 1849)

Awards
Nobel Prize for Literature: Christian Matthias Theodor Mommsen

References

 
Years of the 20th century in literature